Sergio García de la Iglesia (born 8 August 1989) is a Spanish footballer who plays as a forward for CD Guijuelo.

He began his career at Valladolid, playing mostly in their reserves in the Segunda División B. He also represented Salamanca, Zamora, Real Oviedo and Cartagena in the same level, winning the league title with Oviedo in 2014–15.

Club career

Valladolid
Born in Zamora, Castile and León, García was a Real Valladolid youth graduate. He made his senior debut with the reserves in the 2006–07 season, in Segunda División B.

On 4 April 2010, García made his first-team – and La Liga – debut, coming on as a 34th-minute substitute for Marquitos in a 0–2 home loss to Villarreal CF. The campaign ended in relegation, and that would be his only competitive appearance with the main squad.

Salamanca
On 23 July 2010, García moved to Segunda División club UD Salamanca on a two-year deal. He made his official debut on 29 August, replacing Kike for the last minutes of a 1–1 home draw against Córdoba CF.

García scored his first professional goal in his only start of the season, opening the 2–2 home draw with CD Numancia on 4 June 2011. He totalled only 124 minutes of action, again experiencing relegation.

In his second year with the Charros, García recorded eight goals in 31 third-tier matches, including a brace on 5 February 2012 in a 3–2 victory over Sestao River Club at the Helmántico Stadium.

Later years
On 29 July 2012, free agent García moved to Zamora CF also from division three. He netted eight times during his tenure, including a brace on 23 March 2013 to give his team a lead at Real Oviedo before falling 3–2 at the end.

García joined Oviedo on 24 June 2013. He scored six goals in his first season, including twice in the 4–1 win at UD Logroñés with only 30 minutes on the field. In his second, his six successful strikes from 35 appearances helped the Asturians to secure promotion back to the second tier after thirteen years; highlights included another double in a 4–0 home rout of SD Amorebieta in the first round of the Copa del Rey, on 3 September 2014.

García returned to the third division on 27 July 2015, signing a two-year contract at FC Cartagena.

Honours
Oviedo
Segunda División B: 2014–15

References

External links

1989 births
Living people
People from Zamora, Spain
Sportspeople from the Province of Zamora
Spanish footballers
Footballers from Castile and León
Association football forwards
La Liga players
Segunda División players
Segunda División B players
Tercera División players
Segunda Federación players
Real Valladolid Promesas players
Real Valladolid players
UD Salamanca players
Zamora CF footballers
Real Oviedo players
FC Cartagena footballers
CD Toledo players
Real Avilés CF footballers
CD Guijuelo footballers
Spain youth international footballers